The Montenegrin Chess Championship is organized by the Montenegro Chess Federation.

Montenegro also participated in the Yugoslav Chess Championship until 1991 and the Serbia and Montenegro Chess Championship between 1992 and 2006.

Men's championship winners 

{| class="sortable wikitable"
! No. !! Year !! Champion
|-
| 52 || 2000 || Dragiša Blagojević
|-
| 56 || 2004 || Nikola Djukić
|-
| 59 || 2007 ||Dragiša Blagojević
|-
| 60 || 2008 || Milan Drasko
|-
| 61 || 2009 ||Dragiša Blagojević
|-
| 62 || 2010 || Dragan Kosić
|-
| 63 || 2011 ||Nikola Djukić
|-
| 64 || 2012 ||Nikola Djukić
|-
| 65 || 2013 ||Nikola Djukić
|-
| 66 || 2014 ||Nikola Djukić
|-
| 67 || 2015 ||Nikola Djukić
|-
| 68 || 2016 || Dragan Kosić
|-
| 69 || 2017 ||Nikola Djukić
|-
| 70 || 2018 ||Nikola Djukić
|-
| 71 || 2019 ||Nikola Djukić
|-
|  || 2020 ||Not held
|-
| 72 || 2021 ||Luka Drašković
|}

Women's championship winners 

{| class="sortable wikitable"
! No. !! Year !! Champion
|-
| 1 || 2007 || Aleksandra Mijović
|-
| 2 || 2008 || Marija R. Stojanović
|-
| 3 || 2009 || Jovana Vojinović
|-
| 4 || 2010 ||Jovana Vojinović
|-
| 5 || 2011 ||Aleksandra Mijović
|-
| 6 || 2012 || ?
|-
| 7 || 2013 || Sanja Misović
|-
| 8 || 2014 || Nina Delević
|-
| 9 || 2015 || Nevena Radošević
|-
| 10 || 2016 || Tijana Blagojević
|-
| 11 || 2017 || Lidija Blagojević
|-
| 12 || 2018 || Tijana Rakić
|-
| 13 || 2019 ||
|}

Crosstable
{| class="wikitable" style="text-align: center;"
|+ Montenegro Women Chess Championship 5th Podgorica 2011
!   !! Player !! Rating !! 1 !! 2 !! 3 !! 4 !! 5 !! 6 !! 7 !! 8 !! 9 !! Points !! TB	
|-
| 1 || align=left|	||2172		||*	||½	||1	||½	||1	||1	||1	||1	||1	||7.0||
|- 
| 2 || align=left|	||1802		||½	||*	||½	||1	||0	||½	||1	||1	||1	||5.5||
|-  
| 3 || align=left|	||1999	 	||0	||½	||*	||½	||½	||1	||½	||1	||1	||5.0||	15.25	
|-
| 4 || align=left|	        ||1857		||½	||0	||½	||*	||0	||1	||1	||1	||1	||5.0||	15.00	
|-
| 5 || align=left|	        ||1826		||0	||1	||½	||1	||*	||½	||½	||0	||1	||4.5||	
|-
| 6 || align=left|	        ||1731		||0	||½	||0	||0	||½	||*	||1	||1	||1	||4.0||	
|-
| 7 || align=left|	||0		||0	||0	||½	||0	||½	||0	||*	||½	||1	||2.5||	6.00
	
|-
| 8 || align=left|	        ||1914	 	||0	||0	||0	||0	||1	||0	||½	||*	||1	||2.5||	5.75
	
|-
| 9 || align=left|	||0		||0	||0	||0	||0	||0	||0	||0	||0	||*	||0.0||
|}

{| class="wikitable" style="text-align: center;"
|+ Montenegro Women Chess Championship 3rd Cetinje 2009
!   !! Player !! Rating !! 1 !! 2 !! 3 !! 4 !! 5 !! 6 !! 7!! Points !! TB	
|-
| 1 || align=left|	||2341		||*	||1	||1	||1	||1	||1	||1	||6.0||	
|-
| 2 || align=left|	        ||1943		||0	||*	||½	||½	||1	||1	||1	||4.0||	
|-  
| 3 || align=left|	||2057	 	||0	||½	||*	||½	||1	||1	||½	||3.5||	
|-
| 4 || align=left|	        ||1755		||0	||½	||½	||*	||0	||½	||1	||2.5||	5.50
	
|-
| 5 || align=left|	        ||1738		||0	||0	||0	||1	||*	||1	||½	||2.5||	4.50
	
|- 
| 6 || align=left|	||0		||0	||0	||0	||½	||0	||*	||1	||1.5||	
|-
| 7 || align=left|	        ||1825	 	||0	||0	||½	||0	||½	||0	||*	||1.0||
|}

References

External links
Official website of the Montenegro Chess Federation
Results from The Week in Chess: 2007, 2007, 2008

Chess national championships
Women's chess national championships
Chess in Montenegro
Chess
Chess
Chess